Tlapanec, Tlappanec, Tlapaneco or Meꞌphaa may refer to:

 Tlapanec people, an indigenous people of Mexico
 Tlapanec language, an indigenous Mesoamerican language